Risk is a turn-based strategy video game based on the board game of the same name.

Gameplay
The player can select as many as five computer opponents. The player can play either the British or American version of the game, including the extra armies cards.

Reception
Computer Gaming World stated that while the computer version offered the convenience of an automated opponent for solitary players, the board game would likely be more fun for most because they would not have to crowd around the computer, which could not easily display the entire world at once.

The game was reviewed in 1990 in Dragon #156 by Hartley, Patricia, and Kirk Lesser in "The Role of Computers" column. The reviewers gave the game 5 out of 5 stars.

References

External links
Risk at MobyGames
Risk at PFO32

1988 video games
Amiga games
Apple II games
Atari ST games
BlackBerry games
Classic Mac OS games
Commodore 64 games
DOS games
IOS games
Multiplayer and single-player video games
PlayStation (console) games
PlayStation 3 games
PlayStation 4 games
PlayStation Network games
Risk (game)
Sega Genesis games
Video games based on board games
Video games developed in the United States
Windows games
Windows Mobile games
Xbox 360 games
Xbox 360 Live Arcade games
Xbox One games
Zoë Mode games